This page shows the results of the 2008 Centrobasket Championship for Women, which was held in the city of Morovis, Puerto Rico from July 17 to July 21, 2008.

Group stage

Group A

Group B

Knockout stage

Bracket

5th place bracket

Classification 5-8

Semifinals

Seventh place game

Fifth place game

Third place game

Final

Final standings

References
FIBA Americas
Results

Centrobasket Women
2008–09 in North American basketball
2008 in women's basketball
2008 in Puerto Rican sports
International women's basketball competitions hosted by Puerto Rico
2008 in Central American sport
2008 in Caribbean sport